Audio Bullys are an English electronic music project, originally consisting of Simon Franks and Tom Dinsdale.

Franks and Dinsdale released their debut album Ego War in 2003, and two years later followed up with Generation, which featured a collaboration with Suggs and keyboardist Mike Barson of Madness on the track "This Road" and a collaboration with Suggs and Madness saxophonist Lee Thompson on the subsequent track "Struck by the Sound". Their 2005 hit "Shot You Down", which sampled the Nancy Sinatra version of the song "Bang Bang (My Baby Shot Me Down)", reached number 3 in the UK Singles Chart.

Their third album Higher Than the Eiffel, released on 29 March 2010, featured another collaboration with Suggs and Barson on the track "Twist Me Up", with Suggs' daughter Viva providing backing vocals on the track "Smiling Faces".

Discography

Studio albums

Compilation albums 
 Back to Mine: Audio Bullys (2003)

Singles

References

External links
 Official Facebook
 Official Twitter

Astralwerks artists
English electronic music duos
English dance music groups
Electronic dance music duos
Male musical duos
Big beat groups
Musical groups established in 2001